Joyce Olivia Green (born March 2, 1940) is an American rockabilly musician. She is best known for her song Black Cadillac.

Early life 
Joyce Green was born to Eva (Phillips) and Glenn Green in Bradford, Arkansas. She has one sister, Doris, and three brothers, Dalon, Philip, and Glenn Jr.

Joyce learned to play guitar from her brother, Glenn, at age nine. The Green siblings frequently performed together in church. Joyce participated in various talent competitions, which she often won.

Career 
Joyce made her radio debut in 1957 with fellow musician Jimmy Douglas. She continued to perform with Douglas on the radio and at local Arkansas establishments. She was hired by Leon Gambill to perform regularly at Oasis Club in Bald Knob, Arkansas and soon began touring locally.

In 1959, Joyce wrote the song Black Cadillac with her sister Doris. She played the song for Arlen Vaden who arranged a recording session for her at KLCN in Blytheville, Arkansas. Joyce sang and played rhythm guitar on the record which included the song Tomorrow on the A-side and Black Cadillac on the B-side. The other musicians on the record included Tommy Holder on guitar, Teddy Redell on piano, Scotty Kuykendall on bass and Harvey Farley on drums. The record was released on Vaden Records in March 1959. Joyce embarked on a promotional tour with Larry Donn and Carl Perkins to support the record. The record was never commercially successful and Joyce did not record again until the 1970s. These later recordings were lost in a fire.

Joyce's record later became highly sought after by Rockabilly collectors. In 2006, Rhino Records released Rockin' Bones: 1950s Punk & Rockabilly, a four-disc box set that included Black Cadillac.

Joyce no longer performs or records. She lives in Bradford with her husband, James. The couple has one son.

References

American rockabilly musicians
American rockabilly guitarists
Living people
1940 births
American women rock singers
21st-century American women